The Eleventh Hour and The Sixth Hour were brand names given to the eleven P.M. and six P.M. (respectively) local newscasts on NBC owned-and-operated television stations (such as WNBC-TV and KNBC-TV) from the mid-1960s until about 1974, when the NewsCenter branding began to be used. Other NBC affiliates not directly owned by the network also used this branding.

The name is not to be confused with a dramatic series of the same name which ran on NBC in the early 1960s, or a similarly named series on CBS which ran in 2008.

See also
Action News
Eyewitness News

Local news programming in the United States
Television news program articles using incorrect naming style